

Events 
January 12 – Domenico Cimarosa is buried at Chiesa di Sant’Angelo, Venice, with a requiem mass performed by local musicians.
March 28 – Ludwig van Beethoven's ballet The Creatures of Prometheus (Die Geschöpfe des Prometheus) premières in Vienna's Burgtheater.
April 12 – Théâtre Feydeau in Paris closes down as a result of its director's other commitments.
April 21 – The Teatro Nuovo in Trieste is inaugurated with a performance of Johann Simon Mayr's Ginevra di Scozia.
April 24 – Joseph Haydn's oratorio The Seasons is premièred as Die Jahreszeiten in Vienna for its aristocratic patrons at the Palais Schwarzenberg; it has its public première on May 19 at the Redoutensaal.
December 27 – Nineteen-year-old Niccolò Paganini becomes first violin of Lucca's national orchestra. 
 Publication of Introduction to the Art of Playing on the Piano Forte by Muzio Clementi in London.
 Probable publication of A Favorite Collection of Tunes with Variations Adapted for the Northumberland Small Pipes, Violin, or Flute by William Wright in Newcastle upon Tyne with contributions by John Peacock (piper).

Published popular music
"'Twas in the Solemn Midnight Hour", composed and sung by Mrs Bland

Classical music
Ludwig van Beethoven
Violin Sonata No. 4, Op. 23
Violin Sonata No. 5, Op. 24 
Piano Sonata No. 12, Op. 26 
Piano Sonata No. 13 & No. 14 (Moonlight), Op. 27
Piano Sonata No. 15, Op. 28
String Quintet, Op. 29 
The Creatures of Prometheus, Op. 43 
Johann Baptist Cramer – Piano Sonatas, Op. 25
Jan Ladislav Dussek 
Two Piano Sonatas C.184-5
Piano Concerto, Op. 49
John Field – Three Piano Sonatas Op. 1 
Franz Joseph Haydn 
Mass in B-flat major, Hob.XXII:13
The Spirit's Song, Hob.XXVIa:41
Franz Krommer – 3 String Quartets, Op. 19
John Marsh – Symphony no. 30 in E minor
Johann Baptist Vanhal – Clarinet Sonata in C major
Pavel Vranický – Ballet Das Urteil des Paris
Joseph Woelfl – Duet for Cello and Piano, Op. 31
Anton Wranitzky – 3 String Quintets, Op. 8
Carl Friedrich Zelter – 12 Lieder am Clavier zu singen, Z.122

Opera
Domenico Cimarosa – Artemisia
Simon Mayr – Ginevra di Scozia
Étienne Méhul – L'irato
Rodolphe Kreutzer – Astyanax
Marcos Portugal – La morte di Semiramide
Johan Rudolf Zumsteeg – Das Pfauenfest

Methods and theory writings 

 Johann Georg Heinrich Backofen – Anleitung zum Harfenspiel 
 André Ernest Modeste Grétry – Méthode simple pour apprendre à préluder (Paris: l'imprimerie de la République)
 Johann Christian Kittel – Der angehende praktische Organist (Erfurt: Beyer und Maring)
 Giovanni Punto – Étude ou Exercice Journalier (Offenbach: Johann André)
 Karl Zelter – Karl Friedrich Christian Fasch (Berlin: Johann Friedrich Unger)

Births 
January 11 – John Lodge Ellerton, composer (died 1873)
 January 29 – Johannes Bernardus van Bree, composer (died 1857)
February 1 – Adolf Fredrik Lindblad, Swedish Composer (died 1878)
 February 21 – Jan Kalivoda, composer
February 22 – William Barnes, lyricist and writer (died 1886)
March 11 – Frédéric Bérat, composer and songwriter (died 1855)
March 19 – Salvatore Cammarano, Italian librettist (died 1852)
 March 26 – Sophie Daguin, ballerina and choreographer (died 1881)
 April 12 – Joseph Lanner, composer (died 1843)
June 20 – Gustavo Carulli, composer (died 1876)
 June 25 – Antonio D'Antoni, composer and conductor (died 1859)
August 1 – Karl Johann Philipp Spitta, librettist and poet (died 1859)
September 13 – Stefan Witwicki, lyricist and poet (died 1847)
 October 17 – Alessandro Curmi, pianist and composer (died 1857)
 October 23 – Albert Lortzing, composer (died 1851)
 November 3 – Vincenzo Bellini, composer (died 1835)
November 27 – Aleksandr Varlamov, Russian composer (died 1848)

Deaths 
January 11 – Domenico Cimarosa, composer, 51 (probable stomach cancer)
March 2 – Charles-Albert Demoustier, lyricist and writer (born 1760)
March 14 – Christian Friedrich Penzel, composer, 63
March 21 – Andrea Luchesi, composer, 59
March 25 – Friedrich von Hardenberg, librettist and poet (born 1772)
May 13 – Bartholomeus Ruloffs, Dutch conductor and composer, 59
May 14 – Johann Ernst Altenburg, composer, organist and trumpeter, 66
August 31 – Nicola Sala, composer and music theorist, 88
October 23 – Johann Gottlieb Naumann, conductor and composer, 60
November – Thomas Augustine Geary, Irish composer (born 1773)
November 9 – Carl Stamitz, composer, 56 
December 10 – Jonathan Battishill, composer of church music, 63

References

 
19th century in music
Music by year